The University Club of Portland is a private social club that was established in 1898 located in downtown Portland, Oregon. It is known as "Portland's Premier Private Social Club". The clubhouse was built in 1913 and is listed on the National Register of Historic Places.

In 2017, the University Club voted in its first female president, Elizabeth Schleuning.

See also
 National Register of Historic Places listings in Southwest Portland, Oregon
 List of traditional gentlemen's clubs in the United States

References

External links
 

1898 establishments in Oregon
Buildings and structures completed in 1913
Clubhouses on the National Register of Historic Places in Oregon
Clubs and societies in Oregon
National Register of Historic Places in Portland, Oregon
Portland Historic Landmarks
Southwest Portland, Oregon
Tudor Revival architecture in Oregon